Aberoh and Atom are martyrs of the Christian church.

The brothers were citizens of Gamnudi in Egypt. They are described as: Aberoh being of tall stature and a very red appearance, with eyes as blue as indigo. Atom was also tall; his eyes were as antimony and his beard was black. 

They fled Gamnudi during a persecution for Pelusium (then Farama). They were arrested at Alexandria and tortured. After being dismissed by the prefect, they went next to Baramon, where they were beheaded. Their relics were returned to Gamnudi. Their feast day is July 2 in the Coptic Church.

References

Year of birth unknown
Year of death unknown
Coptic Orthodox saints
Christian martyrs
Sibling duos